Guo Wei (10 September 904 – 22 February 954), also known by his temple name as the Emperor Taizu of Later Zhou, was the founding emperor of the Chinese Later Zhou dynasty during the Five Dynasties and Ten Kingdoms period, reigning from 951 until his death.

Nicknamed "Sparrow Guo" after a sparrow-shaped tattoo on his neck, he rose to a high position in the Later Han as an assistant military commissioner. He founded the Later Zhou in 951.

Early life
When Guo Wei was born in 904 in Yaoshan (堯山; in modern Longyao County, Hebei), the Tang dynasty had disintegrated into regions controlled by warlords fighting amongst one another. Guo was just a toddler when his family moved to Taiyuan (in modern Shanxi), as his father Guo Jian became the prefect of Shunzhou (順州, modern Shunyi District, Beijing), serving the Taiyuan-based warlord Li Keyong. Shortly afterwards, Guo Jian was killed by warlord Liu Rengong's forces which conquered Shunzhou, and before Guo Wei's deciduous teeth fell out, his mother Lady Wang also died. Orphaned, the young boy was raised by a distant relative, Lady Han.

Guo Wei grew up into a muscular young man interested more in warfare than agriculture. He was also fond of drinking and gambling, and frequently participated in brawl; his wife Lady Chai often advised him not to indulge in these activities. When he was around 17, to escape arrest, he went to live with an acquaintance Gentleman Chang in Huguan close to Luzhou (潞州, modern Changzhi, Shanxi), shortly before joining the army of Luzhou's interim regent Li Jitao. Li Jitao was serving Jin, ruled by Li Keyong's son Li Cunxu, but actually plotting to defect to the Later Liang, Jin's archenemy. He was therefore more interested in recruiting brave and talented soldiers than enforcing the law, so when an inebriated Guo stabbed a menacing marketplace butcher to death following an argument, he let Guo walk free, eventually summoning Guo back to serve him.

Career under Later Tang
In 923, Li Cunxu established the Later Tang and overthrew Later Liang. Li Jitao was killed a few months later and all of his former soldiers, including 19-year-old Guo Wei, were assigned to the cavalry rotations. As Guo was literate and good at mathematics, he soon became an officer. He delved into the available literature on military strategy as much as he could, particularly enjoying Spring and Autumn Annals for a Wider World, recommended by a blood brother Li Qiong; Guo Wei also regarded Li Qiong as a teacher as he asked Li to explain to him parts of the Annals which he could not understand.

In 927, the Later Tang emperor Li Siyuan personally led an army to suppress Zhu Shouyin's rebellion. Guo Wei, then under the leadership of general Shi Jingtang, was among the first soldiers scaling the defensive wall of Xun (in modern Henan). Shi saw Guo's literary talents and tasked him to manage military records. Guo proved very popular among generals and ministers.

Career under Later Jin
Later Tang was replaced by the Later Jin in 936.

Career under Later Han
The Later Han was a Shatuo-led Chinese dynasty founded by Liu Zhiyuan, posthumously known as Emperor Gaozu of Later Han. Guo Wei was already familiar with life under the Shatuo people as he had lived under their rule since he was nineteen years old. He served as the Assistant Military Commissioner to Liu Zhiyuan. However, when the teenage Liu Chengyou assumed the Later Han throne in 948, court intrigue enabled Guo to usurp the throne in a coup and declare the establishment of the Later Zhou dynasty on New Year's Day in 951 (11 February in the modern calendar).

Reign
He was the first Han Chinese Emperor in northern China since 923. His rule was able and he passed reforms that attempted to relieve pressures on China’s massive peasantry. His rule was vigorous and well-organized. However, he died from an illness three years into his reign in 954.

Ancestry

Family
Consort and issue(s): 
Empress Shengmu, of the Chai clan (聖穆皇后 柴氏)
Pure Consort Yang, of the Yang clan (楊淑妃 楊氏; 911 – 947)
Noble Consort Zhang, of the Zhang clan (張貴妃 張氏; b. 915, executed December 950)
Virtuous Consort Dong, of the Dong clan(董德妃 董氏;915－953)
Unknown
Unnamed Prince, 1st son
Guo Qingge, Prince of Shan (剡王 郭青哥, executed on 24 December 950), 2nd son
Guo Yige (郭意哥, executed on 24 December 950), 3rd son
Unnamed Princess, 1st daughter
Unnamed Princess, 2nd daughter
Princess Chang of Ju State (莒國長公主, executed in 950), 3rd daughter
Princess Shou'an (壽安公主), 4rd daughter
Married Zhang Yongde (張永德)
Princess Yongning (梁國長公主), 5th daughter

References

Sources
  
  
  
  

|-

|-

|-

904 births
954 deaths
Later Zhou emperors
Politicians from Xingtai
Generals from Hebei
Jin (Later Tang precursor) people born during Tang
Later Liang (Five Dynasties) people born during Tang
Later Tang people
Later Jin (Five Dynasties) people
Liao dynasty people
Later Han (Five Dynasties) shumishi
Later Han (Five Dynasties) jiedushi of Tianxiong Circuit
Later Han (Five Dynasties) chancellors
Founding monarchs